High Stakes is a 1931 American Pre-Code comedy drama produced and released by RKO Pictures. The picture was directed by Lowell Sherman who also stars and marks the last starring screen appearance of silent screen diva Mae Murray. It is based on a 1924 Broadway play that starred Sherman playing the same role he plays in this film.

Cast
Lowell Sherman - Joe Lennon
Mae Murray - Dolly Jordan Lennon
Karen Morley - Anne Cornwall
Edward Martindel - Richard Lennon
Leyland Hodgson - Louis Winkler aka Louis DeSalta
Ethel Levey - Mrs. Leonore Gregory
Alan Roscoe - Judge Hennessey
Maude Turner Gordon - Mrs. Hennessey
Charles Coleman - Murray
Phillips Smalley - Mr. Gregory

References

External links

 
poster

1931 films
Films directed by Lowell Sherman
RKO Pictures films
American black-and-white films
American comedy-drama films
1931 comedy-drama films
1930s American films